Agonum bicolor is a species of ground beetle in the Platyninae subfamily. It was described by Dejean in 1828 and is found in Japan, Kazakhstan, Mongolia and Russia. Besides those countries it can be found in the US state of Alaska, and British Columbia, Canada, where it was discovered in March 1981, on Bougie Creek. One of such species was found near Liard River in May 1981.

Subspecies
Agonum bicolor bicolor
Agonum bicolor kitanoi Habu, 1956 (Japan)

References

Beetles described in 1828
bicolor
Beetles of Asia